Aleksandr Aleksandrovich Yeshkin (born 8 September 1982) is a Russian professional football coach and a former player. He is the manager of FC Khimik-Avgust Vurnary.

Club career
He made his debut for FC Torpedo-ZIL Moscow on 14 September 2002 in a Russian Cup game against FC Lada Tolyatti. He played 4 seasons in the Russian Football National League for FC Metallurg-Kuzbass Novokuznetsk, FC Lada Tolyatti and FC Dynamo Barnaul.

References

1982 births
Living people
Russian footballers
Association football midfielders
FC Moscow players
FC Novokuznetsk players
FC Lada-Tolyatti players
FC Dynamo Barnaul players
FC Nizhny Novgorod (2007) players
FC Tyumen players
FC Tekstilshchik Ivanovo players
FC Znamya Truda Orekhovo-Zuyevo players
FC Dynamo Kirov players
Russian football managers